SDDC may stand for:

 China Village Electrification Program (Song Dian Dao Cun) 
 Single-device data correction
 Software-defined data center
 Surface Deployment and Distribution Command